Michael Hodges is an American singer-songwriter, record producer, composer, executive music producer and music executive best known for his work in music for film and television most notably on Blade Runner 2049 (2017), Point Break (2015), The Expanse (2015–2020) and Pete the Cat (2017–present). He has received three Grammy nominations for his work as songwriter and producer. In 2017, Hodges was an executive music producer on Blade Runner 2049, produced the Blade Runner 2049 soundtrack and co-wrote and produced the only original song on the album "Almost Human" performed by Lauren Daigle. The album debuted at No. 1 in the "Billboard" Soundtrack Sales Charts and No. 53 in the "Billboard" 200. In October 2017, Hodges signed on as executive music producer and co-composer of the Amazon Original Series Pete the Cat. In 2018, The Blade Runner 2049 Soundtrack, co-produced by Hodges, was nominated for a Grammy for Best Score Soundtrack for Visual Media.

Early life and career
Born Michael E. Hodges in Little Rock, Arkansas USA, Michael began his love for music at an early age. At the age of 12 he performed his first solo concert and by 22 had his first No. 1 song. Hodges continued his music career touring, writing songs and singing background vocals for several notable bands. In 2013, he was approached by Ken Caillat and Kayla Morrison about starting a unique record label focused on film and television. In 2013 Hodges assisted in building Sleeping Giant Media, an artist friendly publishing catalog with a network of writers, artists, producers and composers credited with numerous Grammy, Emmy and Oscar nominations and awards. In 2014, Hodges assisted in the development of an integrated business model for film, television, and music and became Co-CEO of ASG Music Group, LLC (Alcon Sleeping Giant) a joint venture between Alcon Entertainment and Sleeping Giant Media.

Discography

Films

Television

References

External links
 
 

Living people
Songwriters from California
American film score composers
American television composers
Video game composers
Musicians from Los Angeles
Record producers from Los Angeles
American male film score composers
Year of birth missing (living people)
American male songwriters